This is a list of number-one singles in Belgium from VRT Top 30 (1970–1995) and Ultratop (1995–present). In Belgium there are two parallel industry standard ("official") hit music charts, one for the Dutch-speaking and another for the French-speaking community.

Flemish

Number-one singles per year from the VRT Top 30 (1980–1995) and Ultratop 50 (1995–present)

1980
1981
1982
1983
1984
1985
1986
1987
1988
1989

1990
1991
1992
1993
1994
1995
1996
1997
1998
1999

2000
2001
2002
2003
2004
2005
2006
2007
2008
2009

2010
2011
2012
2013
2014
2015
2016
2017
2018
2019

2020
2021
2022
2023

Francophone

Number-one singles per year from the Ultratop 50 (1995–present)

1995
1996
1997
1998
1999

2000
2001
2002
2003
2004
2005
2006
2007
2008
2009

2010
2011
2012
2013
2014
2015
2016
2017
2018
2019

2020
2021
2022
2023

References